Institute of Mathematics, Physics, and Mechanics (IMFM) is the leading research institution in the areas of mathematics and theoretical computer science in Slovenia. It includes researchers from University of Ljubljana, University of Maribor and University of Primorska. It was founded in 1960.

The IMFM is composed of the following departments:

 Department of Mathematrics
 Department of Physics
 Department of Theoretical Computer Science

The director is Jernej Kozak.

References

External links 

 

Research institutes in Slovenia
Mathematical institutes
Physics institutes
Scientific organizations established in 1960
Scientific organizations in Ljubljana